Alex Kamenev is a theoretical physicist, at the William I Fine Theoretical Physics Institute, University of Minnesota, specializing in condensed matter. Kamenev's current research focuses on theoretical condensed matter physics, disordered systems and glasses, field-theoretical treatment of many-body systems, mesoscopic systems, out of equilibrium systems. Kamenev earned his M.Sci. degree theoretical physics, in 1987 from Moscow State University and a Ph.D. in solid-state physics, in 1996 from Weizmann Institute of Science in Israel.

Honors and awards  
Kamenev was elected a fellow of the American Physical Society in 2013; elected an Alfred P. Sloan Research Fellow from 2004 to 2008; and was awarded the McKnight Land-Grant Professorship for the years of 2005–2007.

Publications 
He is the author of a book, Field Theory of Non-Equilibrium Systems, Cambridge University Press (2011) and a   number of journal articles. His most cited article, cited 589 times according to Google Scholar    is Boris L. Altshuler, Yuval Gefen, Alex Kamenev, and Leonid S. Levitov "Quasiparticle Lifetime in a Finite System: A Nonperturbative Approach" published in 2003 in vol. 78 of  Physical Review Letters

References 

Theoretical physicists
Living people
Russian physicists
Moscow State University alumni
Weizmann Institute of Science alumni
University of Minnesota faculty
Place of birth missing (living people)
Year of birth missing (living people)
Fellows of the American Physical Society